Ricardo Brillantes (1912 – November 1961) was a Filipino actor in films made before World War II and also film director and a prominent writer for Bulaklak and Liwayway magazines, who made his first movie under Liwayway Pictures in 1938's Spanish Civil War movie of Mutya ng Katipunan aka Muse of Katipunan.

Brillantes made his first film directorial under Filipinas Pictures in 1950s Batong Buhay and in 1951 under Leopoldo Salcedo Production of Bisig ng Manggagawa.

He stopped making movies in the early 1950s and has never done any film or directorial job. He married Natividad, a town's beauty queen and had six children. He joined politics in 1951 and was elected number one counselor for Caloocan, town of Rizal (now a city) where a street was named after him. He died at the age of 49 in November 1961.

Filmography 

 1938 -Mutya ng Katipunan [Liwayway]
 1939 -Tawag ng Bayan  [Liwayway/Manansala]
 1940 -Lakambini  [Cervantina Filipina Corp.]
 1947 -Bisig ng Batas  [McLaurin Bros.]
 1947 -Hanggang Langit  [Kayumanggi]
 1947 -Maria Kapra  [Sampaguita]
 1947 -Tayug (Ang Bayang Api)  [Pedro Vera]
 1948 -Batang Lansangan  [Milagrosa]
 1948 -Labi ng Bataan  [Premiere]
 1950 -Sundalong Talahib  [Filipinas]
 1950 -Batong Buhay  [Filipinas]  (dir)
 1951 -Bisig ng Manggagawa  [LS]  (dir)

External links

1912 births
1961 deaths
20th-century Filipino male actors
Filipino male film actors